Country House Sunday is a British television series presented by Lynda Bellingham. The programme saw the actress and her team travel to some of Britain's largest and grandest stately homes. It was produced by Twofour.

The show aired on Sunday mornings on ITV at 8.25am (during the ITV Breakfast slot). The series began broadcasting on 21 April 2013 and ended on 8 September 2013, with 21 episodes being made.

Episodes

References

2013 British television series debuts
2013 British television series endings
English-language television shows
ITV Breakfast
ITV (TV network) original programming
Television series by ITV Studios